Journal of Heterocyclic Chemistry is a peer-reviewed scientific journal summarizing progress in the field of heterocycle chemistry. It is a source for the ChemSpider database.

References

Chemistry journals
English-language journals
Wiley-Blackwell academic journals
Bimonthly journals
Publications established in 1964